The Beijing Northeast Ring railway, also known as Shuangqiao–Shahe railway or Shahe railway, is a link railway in Beijing railway hub.

History
The rail starts at Baiziwan station on the southeast ring railway, crosses the Beijing–Harbin railway and Tonghui river to the north, turns to the west of Wangjing, and connects with the Beijing–Baotou line 27.850 kilometers between Qinghe and Shahe Station, with a total length of 36 kilometer. The line was designed by the China Railway Third Design Institute and constructed by the Beijing Railway Bureau. Construction began on January 13, 1960, and in 1961 the track was laid to the north of Xinghuo. In 1961, the construction of Baiziwan was suspended due to the difficulty of relocation and land purchasing. Construction resumed in 1966. By an original industrial railway connecting Beijing East station, the temporary transition rail line opened on December 10, 1968. Train services officially began in January 1972.

Operation
All passenger services of station on this railway stopped in 1999 with the second China Railway speed-up project and the last through passenger service (2101/2) was cancelled on May 15, 2016. The line is now mainly used for the movement of empty carriages and freight.

On November 11, 2016, the terminal for suburban rail line  was transferred to Huangtudian station. Services will begin to operate on the  suburban rail line before the end of 2020.

Moreover, all type of locomotives, passenger and freight trains made in China, both for China Railway and metros, require several tests on the circular test centre before mass productions, so the Northeast Ring railway is also the only railway line where all trains are translocated by locomotives.

See also

Rail transport in the People's Republic of China
List of railways in China

References 

Railway lines in China
Rail transport in Beijing